Hatsue (written: 初枝) is a feminine Japanese given name. Notable people with the name include:

, Japanese speed skater
Hatsue Ono (1898–2012), Japanese supercentenarian
, Japanese operatic soprano

Fictional characters 
 A young girl in The Sound of Waves by Yukio Mishima
 A young woman in Snow Falling on Cedars by David Guterson

Japanese feminine given names